Rhinesuchoides is an extinct genus of prehistoric temnospondyl in the family Rhinesuchidae. It contains two species, R. tenuiceps and R. capensis, both from the Karoo Supergroup of South Africa. The latter was formerly a species of Rhinesuchus.

See also

 Prehistoric amphibian
 List of prehistoric amphibians

References

Stereospondyls